Saharat Sontisawat (born 13 January 1998) is a Thai professional footballer who plays as a midfielder for Thai League 1 club Chonburi.

References

External links
 

1998 births
Living people
Saharat Sontisawat
Saharat Sontisawat
Association football midfielders
Saharat Sontisawat
Saharat Sontisawat
Saharat Sontisawat